Jelena Janković won in the final 6–3, 3–6, 6–3 over Carla Suárez Navarro.

Seeds

Draw

Finals

Top half

Bottom half

External links 
 Main draw
 Qualifying draw

Singles